Torreblanca is a Mexican rock and pop band based in Mexico City led by musician and composer Juan Manuel Torreblanca.

History 
In 2007, Juan Manuel Torreblanca was selected by the Red Bull Music Academy to participate in forums and workshops in Toronto, Canada, where he also made several concerts. In 2008, Juan Manuel participated in the Sónar Festival. After the festival, he decided to form a band to make a new musical proposal. Through MySpace he met Alejandro Balderas, who plays the flute, saxophones, clarinet and the transverse flute. Also they invited Jerson Vázquez on the drums and Carlos Zavala "El Abuelo" on bass, with whom Juan Manuel had formed previously the group Un Teni.

The new band with the name Torreblanca, taken from the last name of Juan Manuel, published an EP, Defense, with four songs, co-produced by Arturo "Turra" Medina and León Polar, LoBlondo from Hello Seahorse! and Natalia Lafourcade. After listening to them at Vive Latino festival, Quique Rangel from Café Tacuba decided to be the producer of their first LP, Bella época.

In 2012 the song "Roma" was the theme of a Telcel ad campaign. In 2014 Torreblanca published another production, El polvo en la luz produced by Hector Castillo, receiving good reviews.

Members 
 Juan Manuel Torreblanca, piano, vocals
 Alejandro Balderas “El Tío”, flute, sax, clarinet and vocals
 Carlos Zavala “El Abuelo”, bass
 Jerson Vázquez, drums
 Natalie Reyes, accordion, synth, vocals

Past members 
 Andrea Balency, accordion
 Carmen Ruíz, accordion, vocals

Discography

Studio albums 
 2011: Bella Época
 2014: El Polvo En La Luz
 2016: Algo Se Quedó Sin Decir

EP 
 2010: Defensa.

References 

Mexican alternative rock groups
Rock en Español music groups
Musical groups established in 2007